The 2017 Women's European Volleyball League was the ninth edition of the annual Women's European Volleyball League, which features women's national volleyball teams from twelve European countries.

In their first appearance in the competition, Ukraine won the title after defeating Finland in the final.

Teams

League round
All times are local.

Pool A

|}

Week 1
Venue:  Tirana Olympic Park, Tirana, Albania

|}

Week 2
Venue:  Chizhovka-Arena, Minsk, Belarus

|}

Pool B

|}

Week 1
Venue:  Tbilisi Sports Palace, Tbilisi, Georgia

|}

Week 2
Venue:  Salle Sportive Métropolitaine, Rezé, France

|}

Pool C

|}

Week 1
Venue:  Polideportivo Huerta del Rey, Valladolid, Spain

|}

Week 2
Venue:  Centro de Desportos e Congressos, Matosinhos, Portugal

|}

Final four
The top placed team from each group and the best second-placed team will qualify for the final four.

Qualified teams

Bracket
All times are local

Semifinal
Leg 1

|}

Leg 2

|}

Final

|}

Final standings

Awards
MVP:  Anna Stepaniuk

References

External links
Official website

See also
2017 Men's European Volleyball League

2017 Women
European Volleyball League
June 2017 sports events in Europe
July 2017 sports events in Europe